Arlen is a given name. Notable people with the given name include:

Arlen Erdahl (born 1931), American politician
Arlen Escarpeta (born 1981), Belizean actor
Arlen Harris (born 1980), American football player
Arlen Lancaster, chief of the United States Department of Agriculture
Arlen López (born 1993), Cuban boxer
Arlen Ness (1939–2019), American motorcycle designer
Arlen Roth (born 1952), American guitarist
Arlen Siegfreid (1946–2020), American politician 
Arlen Siu (1955–1975), Chinese-Nicaraguan writer
Arlen Specter (1930–2012), American politician
Arlen Thompson, drummer of the indie rock group Wolf Parade

See also
Arlen (surname)
Arlen (disambiguation)